The Producers Guild Film Award for Best Actor in a Negative Role (previously known as the Apsara Award for Best Actor in a Negative Role) is given by the producers of the film and television guild as part of its annual award ceremony for Hindi films, to recognize an actor who has delivered an outstanding performance in a negative role, that is in the role of an antagonist. While the official awards ceremony started in 2004, this category was first introduced four years later.

Winners and nominees

2000s

 2004 – No award
 2005 – No award
 2006 – No award
 2007 – No award
 2008 Neil Nitin Mukesh – Johnny Gaddaar as Vikram
 Arjun Rampal – Om Shanti Om as Mukesh Mehra (Mike)
 Kay Kay Menon – Life in a... Metro as Ranjeet
 Shilpa Shukla – Chak De! India as Bindia Naik
 Vivek Oberoi – Shootout at Lokhandwala as Maya Dolas
 2009 Akshaye Khanna – Race as Rajeev Singh
 Govind Namdeo – Sarkar Raj as Hassan Qazi  
 Imran Khan – Kidnap as Kabir Sharma
 Kali Prasad Mukherjee – A Wednesday! as Ibrahim Khan  
 Naseeruddin Shah – Mithya as Gavde

2010s

 2010 Amol Gupte – Kaminey as Sunil Shekhar Bhope (Bhope Bhau) 
 Ajay Devgn – London Dreams as Arjun
 Deepak Dobriyal – Gulaal as Bhati
 Mahesh Manjrekar – Wanted as Inspector Talpade
 Prakash Raj – Wanted as Gani Bhai
 2011 Sonu Sood – Dabangg as Chedi Singh 
 Arjan Bajwa – Crook as Samarth
 Emraan Hashmi – Once Upon a Time in Mumbaai as Shoaib Khan  
 Manoj Bajpai – Raajneeti as Veerendra Pratap 
 Ronit Roy – Udaan as Bhairav

 2012 Prakash Raj - Singham as Jaykant Shikre
 2016 Nawazuddin Siddiqui - Badlapur as Liak Mohammed Tungrekar

See also
Producers Guild Film Awards

Producers Guild Film Awards
Awards established in 2008